Boundji is a district in the Cuvette Region of northeastern Republic of the Congo.

The city is served by Boundji Airport.

References

Cuvette Department
Populated places in the Republic of the Congo